Jacob Samuel Brown (born 10 April 1998) is a professional footballer who plays as a forward for EFL Championship club Stoke City and the Scotland national football team.

Brown started his career with Barnsley, making his professional debut in October 2016. After spending time out on loan at Chesterfield in 2017–18, he broke into the first team at Oakwell, helping them gain promotion to the Championship in 2018–19. In September 2020 he joined Stoke City for an undisclosed fee.

Born and raised in England, Brown was selected by the Scotland national football team in November 2021, being eligible through his mother who is from Glasgow.

Club career

Barnsley
Brown began his career at the Sheffield Wednesday Academy where he was released at the age of 14. He signed for Guiseley at the age of 16 and played in his first senior match against Selby Town in the West Riding County Cup in October 2014. Brown moved to Barnsley in January 2015 after impressing playing against them in an under-18 match. Brown made his debut for Barnsley against Brentford on 22 October 2016, coming on as a late substitute. After spending the first half of the 2017–18 season with Barnsley under-23s, Brown joined League Two side Chesterfield on a six-month loan on 31 January 2018. Brown played 13 times for the Spireites in 2017–18 and was unable to help them avoid relegation to the National League.

Brown broke into the first team at Oakwell in 2018–19 under Daniel Stendel and impressed playing as a winger and won the EFL Young Player of the Month award for January 2019. He signed a new contract in December 2018. He was sent-off for the first time in his career against Southend United on 2 March 2019. Brown played 38 times in 2018–19, scoring eight goals as the Tykes gained promotion back to the Championship. Brown signed a contract extension with Barnsley in May 2019. In 2019–20, Brown provided nine assists as Barnsley battled against relegation and stayed up after winning their final two matches against Nottingham Forest and Brentford.

Stoke City
Brown joined Stoke City on 9 September 2020 for an undisclosed fee. He scored his first goal for Stoke in a 1–0 EFL Cup win against Wolverhampton Wanderers on 17 September 2020, and his first league goal in a 3–0 win against Reading in November. Brown scored six goals in 46 appearances during the 2020–21 season, as Stoke finished in 14th position. He scored on the opening day of the 2021–22 season in a 3–2 win against Reading. Stoke began the season in good form and were in play-off contention at the turn of the year but a poor second half saw the team slip down into mid-table. Brown was top scorer with 14 goals which earned him a new three-year contract and saw him named Player of the Year.

International career
Brown was eligible to play international football for both England and Scotland, being eligible for the latter through his Glasgow-born mother. In November 2021, Brown was selected by Scotland for World Cup qualifying matches against Moldova and Denmark. Brown made his senior international debut for Scotland on 12 November 2021, appearing as a late substitute in a 2–0 win against Moldova.

Career statistics

Club

International

Honours
Barnsley
EFL League One runner-up: 2018–19

Individual
EFL Young Player of the Month: January 2019
Stoke City Player of the Year: 2022

See also
List of Scotland international footballers born outside Scotland

References

1998 births
Living people
Footballers from Halifax, West Yorkshire
Association football forwards
Scottish footballers
Scotland international footballers
English footballers
English people of Scottish descent
Sheffield Wednesday F.C. players
Guiseley A.F.C. players
Barnsley F.C. players
Chesterfield F.C. players
Stoke City F.C. players
English Football League players
Black British sportsmen